Kazimierz Biskupi is a village in Konin County, Greater Poland Voivodeship, in west-central Poland. It is the seat of the gmina (administrative district) called Gmina Kazimierz Biskupi.

The village has a population of 4,280.

References

Kazimierz Biskupi